Jarred Robert Kelenic (born July 16, 1999) is an American professional baseball outfielder for the Seattle Mariners of Major League Baseball (MLB). Kelenic was drafted in the first round of the 2018 MLB draft by the New York Mets and was traded to the Mariners later that year. He made his MLB debut in 2021.

Amateur career
Kelenic attended Waukesha West High School in Waukesha, Wisconsin. In 2016, he was named MVP of USA Baseball's U-18 team that won gold at the Pan American Games. He committed to play college baseball at the University of Louisville.

In July 2017, Kelenic participated in the High School Home Run Derby at Marlins Park. Later that month, he played in the Under Armour All-America Baseball Game. He again played for Team USA in 2017 and won a gold medal for the second consecutive year.

Professional career

New York Mets
Kelenic was considered one of the top prospects for the 2018 Major League Baseball draft. He was drafted sixth overall by the New York Mets and signed with the team for $4.5 million. After signing with the Mets, Kelenic was assigned to the Rookie League Gulf Coast League Mets before being promoted to the Rookie League Kingsport Mets of the Rookie-level Appalachian League in July. In 56 games between the two clubs, he slashed .286/.371/.468 with six home runs, 42 RBIs, and 15 stolen bases.

Seattle Mariners

2018 to 2020
On December 3, 2018, the Mets traded Kelenic, Jay Bruce, Gerson Bautista, Justin Dunn and Anthony Swarzak to the Seattle Mariners in exchange for Robinson Canó, Edwin Díaz, and $20 million. He began 2019 with the West Virginia Power of the Class A South Atlantic League. Kelenic was promoted to the Modesto Nuts of the Class A-Advanced California League in May. Kelenic was named to the 2019 All-Star Futures Game. In August, he was promoted to the Arkansas Travelers of the Class AA Texas League. Over 117 games between the three clubs, he slashed .291/.364/.540 with 23 home runs, 68 RBIs, and twenty stolen bases. He was selected to play in the Arizona Fall League for the Peoria Javelinas following the season. Kelenic did not appear in a minor league game in 2020 due to the cancellation of the minor league season due to the COVID-19 pandemic, and spent the summer at Seattle's training camp.

2021
In February 2021, Kelenic stated that the Mariners had kept him in the minor leagues during the 2020 season because he had refused to sign an extension. His comments occurred after a video of Mariners CEO Kevin Mather speaking to a rotary club was posted online. Mather indicated that Kelenic and fellow Mariners prospect Logan Gilbert would start the 2021 season in the minor leagues, keeping them under team control for an extra year before free agency. After the comments became public, Kelenic said that the Mariners had offered him a contract extension and had told him multiple times that he would have appeared with the major league team in 2020 had he signed it. Instead, Kelenic spent the 2020 season at the team's alternate training site. In response, Mariners general manager Jerry Dipoto said that Kelenic was not yet ready to play on the major league team. To begin the 2021 season, Kelenic was assigned to the Tacoma Rainiers of the Triple-A West League.

On May 13, 2021, Kelenic was added to the 40-man roster and promoted to the major leagues for the first time. He made his debut that day as the starting left fielder against the Cleveland Indians, going hitless in four at-bats. The next day, on May 14, Kelenic recorded his first MLB hit, a two-run home run in the bottom of the third inning for an estimated distance of 403 feet. On June 7, 2021, amid a 0-39 slump, he was sent down to AAA. In June 2021, Kelenic was selected to play in the All-Star Futures Game. Kelenic finished the 2021 season batting .181/.265/.350 with 14 home runs and 43 RBIs in 93 games.

2022
In May 2022, he was optioned to AAA after hitting .140/.219/.291 over 30 games. In 54 games for Tacoma, Kelenic batted .288, with an OBP of .353, and an OPS of .903. He was then called back up to the majors on July 31, replacing Julio Rodríguez, who had been placed on the injured list after getting hit by a pitch.

At the end of the 2022 season, Kelenic had a career batting average of .168, second to John Vukovich for lowest in history for batters with more than 550 plate appearances.

References

External links

1999 births
Living people
Baseball players from Milwaukee
Major League Baseball outfielders
Seattle Mariners players
Gulf Coast Mets players
Kingsport Mets players
West Virginia Power players
Modesto Nuts players
Arkansas Travelers players
Peoria Javelinas players
Tacoma Rainiers players